Will Martin (born 31 August 1984) is a New Zealand-born classical crossover singer.

Martin's first album, released in his native New Zealand, went platinum in 6 weeks. The album, called A New World, featured songs such as "Into the West", "If" and "Going Home".

Will commented on his success with "I am an entertainer; I sing, I can play the piano. I want to bring an entertainment factor to this kind of music because it has never really been done before".

"I intend to rock out with a big orchestra behind me. I want to be real. I want to misbehave. I want to reach people. Dress me like a pop star and let me sing, and maybe some eighteen-year-old girl will go out and buy a classical album for the first time".

Martin released his second album titled Inspirations in New Zealand in late November 2010.

On 23 October he performed the France national anthem "La Marseillaise" at Eden Park in Auckland before the final of the 2011 Rugby World Cup.

Biography
Will Martin was born in Wellington, New Zealand, the son of a lawyer and a nurse.  He has Māori ancestry on his mother's side.  He was brought up in Auckland.  The family had no musical tradition, and Martin began singing seriously only in his teens.

In 2007, Martin obtained a five-album deal with Universal Music worth $3 million.

Discography

Albums

Singles

References

1984 births
Opera crossover singers
Living people
21st-century New Zealand male singers